The Wilkins Lecture was a lecture organised by the Royal Society of London on the subject of the history of science and named after John Wilkins, the first Secretary of the Society. The last Wilkins lecture was delivered in 2003, after which it was merged with the Bernal Lecture and the Medawar Lecture to form the Wilkins-Bernal-Medawar Lecture.

List of recipients

References 

Royal Society lecture series